Sauli Tapani Lehtonen (10 April 1975 in Jyväskylä, Finland – 9 September 1995 in Helsinki, Finland) was a Finnish tango singer.

Biography 
In 1994, he was crowned the tenth Tango King when he won a Finnish tango competition Tangomarkkinat. On 8 September 1995 Lehtonen and his father, who was driving the car, hit a moose in Sipoo. Lehtonen died in the Töölö Hospital in Helsinki in the early morning of 9 September 1995.

Lehtonen was well known for the way he kept his eyes closed when he was singing.

References

1975 births
1995 deaths
20th-century Finnish male singers
Finnish tango musicians
Road incident deaths in Finland